Motu Hafoka (13 March 1987 – 30 June 2012) was a Samoan footballer who played as a goalkeeper. He represented Samoa in the 2012 OFC Nations Cup and in the 2007 OFC U-20 Championship.

He committed suicide by hanging himself from a tree in his family's back yard on Saturday, 30 June 2012.  It is believed that "differences with his family" were the cause of the suicide.

References 

1987 births
2012 deaths
Suicides by hanging
Samoan footballers
Samoa international footballers
Association football goalkeepers
2012 suicides
2012 OFC Nations Cup players
Deaths in Samoa